Nassarius pullus, common names : black nassa; olive dog whelk; ribbed dog whelk, is a species of sea snail, a marine gastropod mollusc in the family Nassariidae, the nassa mud snails or dog whelks.

Description
The length of the shell varies between 10 mm and 25 mm.

The shell is ovate and ventricose. The pointed spire is composed of six or seven whorls. These are slightly angular at their upper part, loaded with very convex longitudinal folds near the suture. These folds are less prominent, and more flattened upon the outer lip of the body whorl. It is intersected by numerous transverse striae. The upper extremity of the fold is sometimes separated by a stria which divides them superficially. The white aperture is ovate, terminated above by an emargination of the outer lip, and by a transverse ridge of the inner lip. The outer lip is thin, slightly denticulated at the base, furnished with numerous striae; internally. The columella is arcuated, covered by the inner lip, which conceals, by its expansion, a part of the body of the shell, and forms a large, white, and polished callosity. The ground color of this shell is whitish, ash or bluish, sometimes without spots or bands, at other times with two or three deeper bands which surround the whorls.

Distribution
This species occurs in the Central and East Indian Ocean off Mauritius, Madagascar and Tanzania ; off East India, Sri Lanka, Thailand, the Philippines, China, and in the Western Pacific Ocean off Papua New Guinea, New Caledonia, the New Hebrides, the Solomon Islands and Australia (Queensland).

References

 Bruguière, J.G. 1789. Buccinum. Encyclopédie Méthodique ou par de matieres. Historie Naturelle des Vers et Mollusques 1: 236–285
 Adams, A. 1852. Catalogue of the species of Nassa, a genus of Gasteropodous Mollusca, belonging to the family Buccinidae, in the Collection of Hugh Cuming, Esq., with the description of some new species. Proceedings of the Zoological Society of London 1851(19): 94–112 
 Dautzenberg, Ph. (1929). Mollusques testacés marins de Madagascar. Faune des Colonies Francaises, Tome III
 Satyamurti, S.T. 1952. Mollusca of Krusadai Is. I. Amphineura and Gastropoda. Bulletin of the Madras Government Museum, Natural History ns 1(no. 2, pt 6): 267 pp., 34 pls
 Spry, J.F. (1961). The sea shells of Dar es Salaam: Gastropods. Tanganyika Notes and Records 56
 Cernohorsky W.O. (1981). Revision of the Australian and New Zealand Tertiary and Recent species of the family Nassariidae (Mollusca: Gastropoda). Records of the Auckland Institute and Museum 18:137–192.
 Wilson, B. 1994. Australian Marine Shells. Prosobranch Gastropods. Kallaroo, WA : Odyssey Publishing Vol. 2 370 pp.

External links
 Linnaeus, C. 1758. Systemae naturae per regna tria naturae, secundum classes, ordines, genera, species, cum characteribus, differetiis, synonymis, locis.v. Holmiae : Laurentii Salvii 824 pp.
 Cernohorsky W. O. (1984). Systematics of the family Nassariidae (Mollusca: Gastropoda). Bulletin of the Auckland Institute and Museum 14: 1–356
 

Nassariidae
Gastropods described in 1758
Taxa named by Carl Linnaeus